Almost a Wild Man is a 1913 Canadian silent short black and white film directed by Dell Henderson, written by William Beaudine and starring Dorothy Gish.

Cast
 Charles Murray as McDoo
 Gus Pixley as The Wild Man
 Edward Dillon as Rooly, Pooly, Dooly
 Clarence L. Barr as Guppy (of Guppy and Fugg)
 Bud Duncan as Fugg (of Guppy and Fugg) / Sideshow Patron
 Kathleen Butler as Actress in The Rise & Fall of McDoo
 Florence Lee as Actress in The Rise & Fall of McDoo
 Dorothy Gish as Miss Smart / Sideshow Patron
 William J. Butler as Policeman / In Audience
 Gertrude Bambrick as Member of Lizzy and Her Dancing Girls Troupe / Blackface Sideshow Patron
 Viola Barry as In Audience
 Lionel Barrymore as In Audience
 George Beranger as In Audience
 Adelaide Bronti as In Audience
 Christy Cabanne as In Audience
 William A. Carroll as In Audience
 Nan Christy as Member of Lizzy and Her Dancing Girls Troupe
 John T. Dillon as In Audience
 Charles Gorman as At Stage Door / Sideshow Patron
 Harry Hyde as In Audience
 J. Jiquel Lanoe as In Audience
 Jennie Lee as In Audience
 Adolph Lestina as In Audience
 Charles Hill Mailes as In Audience
 Alfred Paget as In Audience
 W.C. Robinson as In Audience
 Kate Toncray as In Audience

References

External links
 

Canadian silent short films
Canadian black-and-white films
Films directed by Dell Henderson
Films directed by William Beaudine
Films with screenplays by William Beaudine
Biograph Company films
General Film Company
Canadian comedy short films
1910s Canadian films